Heike Wezel (born 19 October 1968) is a former German cross-country skier who competed from 1990 to 1994. Competing at the 1992 Winter Olympics in Albertville, she had her best career finish of eighth in the 4 × 5 km relay and her best individual finish of 17th in the 5 km event.

At the 1993 FIS Nordic World Ski Championships in Falun, her best individual finish was 39th in the 15 km event. Her best World Cup career finish was fourth in a 10 km event in Norway in 1990.

Wezel best individual career finish was second in a 5 km FIS race in Sweden in 1993.

Cross-country skiing results
All results are sourced from the International Ski Federation (FIS).

Olympic Games

World Championships

World Cup

Season standings

References

External links

Women's 4 x 5 km cross-country relay Olympic results: 1976-2002 

1968 births
Cross-country skiers at the 1992 Winter Olympics
German female cross-country skiers
Living people
Olympic cross-country skiers of Germany
People from Klingenthal
Sportspeople from Saxony